Samuel George "Goldie" Prodgers (often misspelled Prodger) (February 18, 1891 – October 25, 1935) was a Canadian ice hockey player. During his career he played for the Waterloo Colts, Quebec Bulldogs, Victoria Aristocrats, Montreal Wanderers, Montreal Canadiens, Toronto 228th Battalion, Toronto St. Pats, and Hamilton Tigers. He won the Stanley Cup in 1912 with the Bulldogs, and in 1916 with the Canadiens, and retired in 1925.

Playing career
George Prodgers was born in London, Ontario and played amateur hockey for the London Athletic, joining its junior team in 1908, and graduating to their intermediate team for the 1909–10 season. He turned professional for the Waterloo Colts of the Ontario Professional Hockey League for the 1910–11 season. When Waterloo folded its team, Prodgers, along with Eddie Oatman and Jack McDonald joined the Quebec Bulldogs of the National Hockey Association (NHA). The Bulldogs won the NHA championship and the Stanley Cup, and defeated Moncton in a Stanley Cup challenge series. Prodgers joined the Victoria Aristocrats for the 1912–13 season despite being under contract with Quebec. He returned to Quebec for one season, before joining the Montreal Wanderers for a season and a season with the Montreal Canadiens. While playing for the Canadiens, the Canadiens went to its first Stanley Cup finals, winning the series on a goal by Prodgers.

He enlisted with the Canadian Expeditionary Force and played for the Toronto 228th Battalion for the last NHA season (1916–17) before being shipped overseas. He returned to Canada in 1919, but refused to report to Quebec which was assigned his playing rights in the new National Hockey League (NHL). He was traded between several teams before he settled in with the new Toronto St. Patricks. After that one season with Toronto, he joined the Hamilton Tigers where he had his best offensive seasons, scoring 18 goals in 1920–21. He stayed with the Tigers until the end of the 1924–25 season. The Tigers were suspended at the end of the season after a player's strike and their contracts sold to the New York Americans. Prodgers retired at that point, but after a season away, he joined the London Panthers of the Canadian Professional League, whom he would coach in the following season.

Post-playing career
He died on October 25, 1935 in London, Ontario.

Career statistics

Regular season and playoffs

Transactions
 Signed as a free agent by Waterloo (OPHL), January 5, 1911.
 Signed as a free agent by Quebec (NHA), November 1911.
 Signed by Victoria (PCHA) after jumping contract with Quebec (NHA), November 18, 1912. 
 Traded to Montreal Wanderers (NHA) by Quebec (NHA) for cash, December 4, 1914. 
 NHL rights transferred to Quebec by NHL when Quebec franchise returned to NHL, November 25, 1919. 
 Suspended by Quebec after refusing to report to training camp, November 27, 1919. 
 Traded to Montreal by Quebec for Ed Carpenter, December 21, 1919. 
 Traded to Toronto by Montreal for Harry Cameron, January 14, 1920. 
 Traded to Montreal by Toronto with Joe Matte for Harry Cameron, November 27, 1920. 
 Traded to Hamilton by Montreal with Jack Coughlin, Joe Matte and loan of Billy Coutu for 1920–21 season for Harry Mummery, Jack McDonald and Dave Ritchie, November 27, 1920.

Awards
 Played on the OHA-Jr. first All-Star Team (1909)
 Inducted into the London Sports Hall of Fame (November 2009)

References

External links

1891 births
1935 deaths
Canadian ice hockey centres
Canadian military personnel of World War I
Hamilton Tigers (ice hockey) players
Ice hockey people from Ontario
London Panthers players
Montreal Canadiens (NHA) players
Montreal Canadiens players
Montreal Wanderers (NHA) players
Quebec Bulldogs (NHA) players
Sportspeople from London, Ontario
Toronto St. Pats players
Toronto 228th Battalion players
Victoria Aristocrats players